Grethe Ingmann (born Clemmensen; 17 June 1938 – 18 August 1990) was a Danish singer.

She started her career at 17, when she temporarily performed as a singer of the Malihini Hawaiians pop quartet. Soon after she sang with the Danish guitarist Jørn Grauengaard and his trio.

In 1955 she met her future husband, guitarist Jørgen Ingmann. The couple married in 1956 and performed as the duet Grethe og Jørgen Ingmann. Together they won the Eurovision Song Contest 1963 representing Denmark with the jazz waltz "Dansevise" (Dancing tune) with music by Otto Francker and lyrics by Sejr Volmer-Sørensen. It was the first entry performed by a duo to win the Contest and also the first Scandinavian winner.

In 1965 she entered the German Schlager Contest with the song "Sommerwind". She dropped out in the preliminaries, but the song's English version, written by Johnny Mercer in 1966 and sung by Frank Sinatra, became an international hit.

Grethe and Jørgen Ingmann continued their musical career until they divorced in 1975. As a solo singer, Grethe participated in several Danish pre-selections for the Eurovision Song Contest, unsuccessfully. The couple remarried in the 1980s. Grethe died of cancer on 18 August 1990, aged 52, becoming the first Eurovision winner to die.

References

External links 
 
 

1938 births
1990 deaths
20th-century Danish women singers
Eurovision Song Contest winners
Eurovision Song Contest entrants for Denmark
Eurovision Song Contest entrants of 1963
Danish pop singers
People from Frederikssund Municipality